The Corps of Commissionaires refers to a global movement in Commonwealth countries of societies created to provide meaningful employment for veterans of the armed services. The Commissionaires movement traces its roots to 1859, when Captain Sir Edward Walter KCB organized seven disabled veterans of the Crimean War and Indian Mutiny to act as nightwatchmen.

Commissionaires appear in several of the Sherlock Holmes stories by Sir Arthur Conan Doyle, including "The Adventure of the Blue Carbuncle" and "The Adventure of the Naval Treaty."

Active Corps 

 Corps of Commissionaires (UK), the original corps now organized as a private security company operating as Corps Security, employing 5,000 in the United Kingdom and Papua New Guinea.
 Canadian Corps of Commissionaires, a federation of 15 not-for-profit social benefit organizations employing 23,000 in Canada and the largest private security organization in that country.

Former Corps 

 Australian Corps of Commissionaires
 South African Corps of Commissionaires

References 

Commonwealth of Nations
Veterans' affairs